John Philip "Trink" Trinkaus (23 May 1918, Rockville Centre, New York – 8 February 2003, Guilford, Connecticut) was an American embryologist and one of the world's leading experts on in vivo cell motility.

Biography
Trinkaus graduated in 1940 with a B.A. in biology from Wesleyan University and in 1941 with an M.A. from Columbia University. In 1941 he matriculated at Johns Hopkins University, but WW II interrupted his graduate study. In August 1942 he was drafted into the U.S. Army. In the spring of 1943 he went on leave for a week to marry Galina Gorokhoff, whom he had met a few years earlier at the Marine Biological Laboratory in Woods Hole. After being stationed in the United States and training U.S. Army Air Force officers in the use of oxygen equipment, he was sent to Italy in the autumn of 1944 to train officers in the use of G-suits. He was discharged from the U.S. Army in December 1945. In 1948 he graduated with a Ph.D. in embryology from Johns Hopkins University.

In 1948 Trinkaus became an instructor in Yale University's department of zoology (which later became the department of biology). He was soon promoted to full professor, retaining that position until he retired as professor emeritus. With few exceptions, he spent his summers at the Marine Biological Laboratory in Woods Hole. For the academic year 1959–1960 he was a Guggenheim Fellow at the Collège de France. During that year he met the woman, Madeleine Robineaux, who was to become his second wife. After divorcing their spouses, they married in October 1963. His 1969 book Cells into Organs. The Forces That Shape the Embryo became a classic treatise on cell and tissue movement during embryonic development and cell invasion of bodily tissues. A greatly enlarged 2nd edition was published in 1984.

Trinkaus was a member of NASA's U.S. Space Biology Advisory Panel from 1976 to 1979. He was the author or co-author of about 50 scientific articles during his career. His autobiography was published posthumously in 2004.

Awards and honors
 1959 — Guggenheim Fellowship
 1995 — Edward Grant Conklin Medal from the Society of Developmental Biology.
 1988 — "Trinkfest" (a Festschrift or retirement party) held by the Marine Biological Laboratory in celebration of Trinkaus's 70th birthday

Selected publications

References

External links

1918 births
2003 deaths
American embryologists
20th-century American zoologists
Wesleyan University alumni
Columbia University alumni
Johns Hopkins University alumni
Yale University faculty